Nosophora parvipunctalis is a moth in the family Crambidae. It was described by George Hampson in 1896. It is found in the Tenasserim Hills in the border region of Myanmar and Thailand.

References

Moths described in 1896
Spilomelinae
Moths of Asia